Steve Regal (born August 25, 1951) is an American retired professional wrestler. He is best known for his appearances with the American Wrestling Association.

Professional wrestling career 
Born in Ft. Lauderdale, Florida, Regal started wrestling in 1977 and later achieved his biggest success in the American Wrestling Association (AWA) during the mid-1980s. During his tenure there, Regal defeated Buck Zumhofe for the AWA World Light Heavyweight Championship in 1984. In 1985, the AWA began teaming him with "Gorgeous" Jimmy Garvin and, with the help of the Fabulous Freebirds, defeated The Road Warriors to win the tag title. Regal and Garvin lost the tag title to Curt Hennig and Scott Hall four months later. Regal also made appearances with World Class Championship Wrestling during this time period, challenging Brian Adias for the Texas Heavyweight Title.

The pair then signed to wrestle with the National Wrestling Alliance (NWA)'s Pacific Northwest Wrestling, where he held the NWA Pacific Northwest Heavyweight Championship twice. He vacated the title in December 1981 due to an injury.

Jim Crockett Promotions (1986)
In 1986, he joined Jim Crockett Promotions and made his debut on May 17 at a house show in Baltimore, MD where he fought Denny Brown to a draw for the  NWA World Junior Heavyweight Championship. They would wrestle several more times to draws during the month. Regal made his first televised appearance on the May 24th edition of World Championship Wrestling, facing George South, then appeared on the May 31st edition of NWA Worldwide, facing Rocky King. On the June 7th edition of NWA Pro Wrestling Regal joined heel Jimmy Garvin in attacking Wahoo McDaniel.

On June 4 he sustained his first loss, falling to Denny Brown at a house show in Raleigh, NC. Through June and July Regal continued to face Brown for the title on the Great American Bash house show summer tour; on the final night of the series, he defeated Brown to win the NWA Junior Heavyweight Championship in front of 12,000 at the Fulton County Stadium in Atlanta, GA on August 2. Regal would successfully defend his title several times in August against Brown before finally losing the championship back to him at a house show in Greensville, NC on September 1. Following a match with Hector Guerrero on September 4, he departed for the World Wrestling Federation.

World Wrestling Federation (1986)
While with the AWA and NWA, Regal's career appeared to be on the rise, but by 1985, the WWF roster was full of large athletes and bodybuilders, and the primary focus was on brawling and personality over science. Despite his talent, Regal was used exclusively as a jobber, a fate shared by many WWF wrestlers at the time who were not large bodybuilders and didn't have an over-the-top gimmick. Regal was still billed as "Mr Electricity", but did not receive the promotional vignettes that many of the other incoming wrestlers received who joined the WWF in the second half of 1986, such as Koko B. Ware, Superstar Billy Graham, Dick Slater, Outback Jack, or The Honky Tonk Man.

Regal made his first WWF appearance on September 16, 1986 when he teamed with Terry Gibbs to take on The Junkyard Dog and George Steele in a match that would be televised on the October 11th edition of WWF Superstars. On September 22 he gained his first victory, pinning jobber Jose Luis Rivera at Madison Square Garden. From this point onward however, Regal was winless for several weeks, facing Nick Kiniski, Billy Jack Haynes, Dick Slater, and the Honky Tonk Man. He defeated Jerry Allen on October 22 in Richfield, OH and won a dark match at a WWF Superstars taping on October 28; these would be his last wins. His final WWF match was a loss the following day to Tito Santana and Pedro Morales at Wrestling Challenge, after which he left the promotion.

Jim Crockett Promotions (1988)
Regal returned to the NWA at an event in Peoria, IL on March 20, 1988. He faced and defeated Spike Huber, marking his first wrestling match since leaving the WWF.

Windy City Wrestling (1988–1995)
Regal joined the startup Windy City Wrestling promotion shortly afterwards and was crowned their World Heavyweight Champion. He would hold the title for 619 days, defending the belt against Jim Brunzell, Ken Patera, and Colonel DeBeers. After losing the title he continued to make appearances for WCW through 1995. His final appearance came in a disqualification victory against Jerry De Camillo on February 18, 1995 at a TV taping in Chicago. He retired in 1996.

Personal life
Regal is the son-in-law of wrestler Wilbur Snyder. Currently, he is an executive with General Motors in their vehicle remarketing division.

Championships and accomplishments
American Wrestling Association
AWA World Light Heavyweight Championship (1 time)
AWA World Tag Team Championship (1 time) - with Jimmy Garvin
Central States Wrestling
NWA Central States Tag Team Championship (2 times) – with Dewey Robertson
Continental Wrestling Association
AWA Southern Tag Team Championship (1 time) - with Hector Guerrero
International Association of Wrestling
IAW Heavyweight Championship (3 times)
IAW Tag Team Championship (1 time) - with Jerry De Camillo
Mid-Atlantic Championship Wrestling
NWA World Junior Heavyweight Championship (1 time)
Pacific Northwest Wrestling
NWA Pacific Northwest Heavyweight Championship (2 times)
NWA Pacific Northwest Tag Team Championship (2 times) - with Matt Borne
Pro Wrestling America
PWA Light Heavyweight Championship (1 time)
World Wrestling Association (Indianapolis)
WWA World Tag Team Championship (2 times) - with Spike Huber
Windy City Pro Wrestling
WCPW Heavyweight Championship (1 time)
WCPW Junior Heavyweight Championship (1 time)
Other Titles
FWA America's Championship (1 time)
FWA Junior Heavyweight Championship (1 time)

References

External links 
 
 

1951 births
American male professional wrestlers
Living people
Sportspeople from Fort Lauderdale, Florida
Professional wrestlers from Florida
20th-century professional wrestlers
AWA World Tag Team Champions
AWA World Light Heavyweight Champions